Srđan (Срђан);  ;) is a Serbo-Croatian masculine given name, usually written as Srdjan when the letter đ is unavailable.

It is usually considered to be a form of the name Sergius, honoring the Christian martyr and saint Sergius. In South Slavic, Saints Sergius and Bacchus are called "Sveti Srđ i Sveti Vlaho" or "Srđevdan" or "Srđandan" or Dejandan. Another popular etymology derives it from the Serbo-Croatian verb ''srditi'' which means being angry, fiery or ardent. Alternatively it may derive from adjective ''srdačan'' which means having a good heart

A medieval version of the name was Srdan. Srđa could be a form of Srđan. 

The most common nicknames are Srđa, Srđo, Srki or ''Srle'‘.

People with the name include 
 Srđan Andrić
 Srđan Baljak
 Srđan Blažić
 Srđan Čebinac
 Srđan Cvijić
 Srđan Dragojević
 Srđan Gemaljević
 Srđan Kljajević
 Srdjan Kurpjel
 Srđan Lakić
 Srđan Lukić
 Srđan Marjanović
 Srđan Milić
 Srđan Mrkušić
 Srđan Muškatirović
 Srđan Radonjić
 Srđan Šajn
 Srđan Šaper
 Srđan Spiridonović, Austrian footballer
 Srđan Srećković
 Srđan Stanić (disambiguation)
 Srđan V. Tešin
 Srđan Todorović
 Srđan Urošević
 Srđan Vuletić
 Srđan Žakula

Croatian masculine given names
Serbian masculine given names

de:Serge (Vorname)
es:Sergio
fr:Serge
it:Sergio
hu:Szergiusz
no:Sergei
pl:Sergiusz
pt:Sérgio (prenome)
sk:Sergej